Snow Place Like Home may refer to:

 A 1948 Popeye cartoon
 Chapter IV of the episodically released King's Quest (2015)